Radoszki may refer to the following places:
Radoszki, Kuyavian-Pomeranian Voivodeship (north-central Poland)
Radoszki, Świętokrzyskie Voivodeship (south-central Poland)
Radoszki, West Pomeranian Voivodeship (north-west Poland)